Kim "K.C." Carswell is a fictional character from the British ITV soap opera Coronation Street. She was played by Zoë Henry, making her first appearance on 16 March 2007. K.C. was one of the women Claire Peacock met through her voluntary phone counselling; she had lost her baby. Her character has noted to the police that her nickname is K.C. not Casey, using the first letter in her first name and second name respectively.

Storylines
On 1 April 2007, Claire left her new friend KC babysitting her son, Freddie, while she went out. When she returned, Freddie and KC had gone so she panicked and called the police, worried that KC had kidnapped him. She was worried as she had met KC through her work on the phone lines of a support group for women that had miscarriages. However, KC explained that she had taken Freddie out for a drive as he wouldn't settle but was upset that Claire had called the police and left just as they arrived. However in June, KC was seen stalking Claire, and was thought to be responsible for the fire at 4 Coronation Street. When her photograph appeared in the Weatherfield Gazette and on the news, she went to the police and was released without charge and then confronted Claire.

KC and Claire Peacock resumed their friendship and KC showed an interest in Claire's husband, Ashley, after Claire said she was worried that her marriage was in trouble. On 30 July, KC made her move on Ashley and they were about to sleep together but Claire came home early. Audrey Roberts (a friend of Ashley's late father) was concerned about Ashley and Claire's marriage and saw KC taking Claire's place with Ashley and Josh, while Claire was away (on KC’s advice). Audrey confronted Ashley, who admitted that he was having an affair with KC as Claire didn't seem to realize his needs. Ashley told KC that Audrey knew about their affair and KC confronted Audrey, warning her to stay away but Audrey told her that she was just a fling that Ashley would get over. However, KC stressed that she and Ashley were a proper couple and claimed that they had been having an affair for months. Audrey told KC she'd betrayed Claire as a friend and that the affair was her way to get revenge. KC responded by implying that she, Ashley and Josh would soon be a proper family and neither Audrey or Claire would be able to prevent it. Later, Audrey persuaded Claire to come home and Ashley ended his affair with KC, convinced that Ashley secretly loved her. Claire was shocked to learn that KC had been visiting regularly, helping out with Josh and cooking Ashley dinner and even sleeping there. Claire was suspicious so she and Ashley told KC to leave. Claire asked Ashley if he was sleeping with KC but he denied it. KC confronted Audrey and told her that she pushed Ashley to break Claire's heart and reveal that they were an item. Later, Claire invited KC to lunch and Ashley told her to stop stalking him. KC relished telling Ashley that she's not going anywhere and continued to stalk Ashley for some time. One day she spotted an opportunity to get his attention when he left Freddie with Kirk Sutherland. KC grabbed it, telling Kirk that Ashley had asked her to pick up Freddie and asking Ashley to phone her. She then told Audrey that she and Ashley were a couple and will be getting married. Ashley was horrified to learn that KC had kidnapped Freddie so he phoned her and went to her flat, insisting Kirk keep this from Claire. Audrey, however, told Claire about KC’s behaviour and Kirk told her that KC had taken Freddie so she and Audrey rushed to KC’s flat after calling the police.

Ashley was horrified to see Casey's walls covered with photos of him and saw KC on the balcony, holding Freddie. She admitted starting the fire, explaining that she felt Claire was in the way. Ashley, realizing just how ill his "mistress" was, tried convincing her that her feelings for him weren't real. KC, shocked by Ashley's words, moved closer to the edge of the balcony with Freddie, saying if Ashley didn't love her then she and Freddie might as well be dead. Claire saw this and KC forced Ashley to tell Claire the truth about their affair and had slept together whilst she was at her support group. Claire was silent so KC demanded Ashley propose to her; worried about Freddie, Ashley did so. KC was elated but Claire challenged her. She reminded KC of what she had said about the death of her baby, a boy she named Rhys, and all her hopes for him and how she imagined how her baby would grow up. KC, now irritated, ran toward Claire to make her stop talking and Claire took Freddie. She tried to jump from the balcony but Ashley stopped her just as the police burst in and took an hysterical KC away. In a later episode, the policeman in charge of KC’s case, visited the Peacocks and told Ashley and Claire that KC was mentally unfit to stand trial. She would be sectioned under the Mental Health Act indefinitely as she was a serious danger to other people.

Reception
The plot in which featured KC threatening Freddie, was speculated as being similar to an episode of Tonight with Trevor McDonald. Tragedy mum Natasha Hogan was interviewed to support this.

Zoe Henry revealed that her husband, Jeff Hordley, who plays Cain Dingle in Emmerdale, had given her advice on playing a villainous role.

Interviews Zoe provided the Sunday Mirror:

Following the characters departure, Henry had a guest part in The Bill. before taking on the full-time role of Rhona Goskirk in rival soap, Emmerdale.

See also
List of Coronation Street characters (2007)
List of soap opera villains

References

Coronation Street characters
Fictional criminals in soap operas
Television characters introduced in 2007
Female characters in television
Fictional characters with psychiatric disorders
Female villains
Fictional kidnappers